San Antonio de los Baños Airfield  is a military air base located near San Antonio de los Baños, a municipality in the province of Havana (La Habana) in Cuba.

History

World War II 
The station was built in 1942 and was first used by American forces on 29 August 1942. The U.S. forces called it "Cayuga" (named after the construction company hired by the U.S. to build it - the Cayuga construction company is named after the upstate New York Native American tribe by the same name). The first United States Army Air Forces aircraft arrived at the airfield on 16 October. It was used for antisubmarine patrols and as a training airfield for B-29 Superfortress aircrews who flew training missions from airfields in Nebraska and Kansas to the field.

On September 9, 1942, Cuba and United States signed a new naval and Military Agreement of Cooperation for a second airfield that would later be known as San Julián Air Base. The Pinar del Río area was considered ideally situated for further development and the Army began construction by expanding an existing Pan American World Airways emergency landing airfield on 1 November 1942. When construction was completed on 1 July 1943, the new facility was re-designated Naval Air Facility (NAF) San Julian.

On November 1, 1942, the United States Army Air Forces set up postal operations for San Antonio de los Baños, using Army Post Office, Miami with the address: 632 APO MIA.

From 1943 to 1945, major units assigned were:
 15th Antisubmarine Squadron (26th Antisubmarine Wing), 25 July-1 October 1943 (B-34 Ventura)
 23d Antisubmarine Squadron (26th Antisubmarine Wing), 28 February-24 April 1943 (A-29 Hudson)
 417th Bombardment Squadron (25th Bombardment Group), 13 April 1943-August 1943 (B-18 Bolo)
 314th Bombardment Wing (28 February-24 April 1945 (B-29 Superfortress)
 Detachment: 89th Combat Crew Training Wing, 1943–1945
 Numerous B-17, B-24 and B-29 group air echelons deployed for training from 1943 through 1945

Post-World War II 
With the end of the war, the United States withdrew its military forces from the airfield and it was turned over to the Cuban government on 30 April 1946.

After the handover, it was used by the Cuban Air Force. It was known as the Batista AAF (1953–1959). In a 1962 briefing paper on the Cuban Missile Crisis prepared by officials at the United States Department of Defense, the base was identified as "the headquarters for the Cuban revolutionary Air Force and the assembly point for all MIGs, except the MIG-21, which [had] previously been received in Cuba."

During the Cuban Missile Crisis, Soviet Armed Forces elements deployed as part of Operation Anadyr were based at the airfield. The 32nd Guards Fighter Aviation Regiment of the Soviet Air Forces, flying MiG-21F-13s, had elements there. Initially, the regiment sent its 2nd Squadron from Santa Clara Air Base to San Antonio de los Baños, and then later the whole regiment was concentrated at San Antonio de los Baños. In 1963, the regiment transferred its aircraft to the Cuban Air Force and returned home. In Cuba, the regiment served under the title 213th Fighter Aviation Regiment.

Facilities

San Antonio de los Baños Air Base
The airport is an active Cuban Revolutionary Armed Forces airbase:

 UM 1779th Regiment 
 UM 2661 Squadron- Mikoyan MiG-29A and UB, Mikoyan-Gurevich MiG-23ML and UB fighters
 UM 5010 Intercept Squadron - Mikoyan-Gurevich MiG-21BIS fighters and Mikoyan-Gurevich MiG-21UM fighter trainers

References

External links
 

1942 establishments in Cuba
Airports in Cuba
Buildings and structures in Artemisa Province
Military installations of Cuba
Military installations of the Soviet Union in other countries
Soviet Air Force bases
20th-century architecture in Cuba